René Schmidheiny (born 4 January 1967 in Basle) is a Swiss bobsledder who competed in the mid-1990s. At the 1994 Winter Olympics in Lillehammer, he finished seventh in the four-man event.

Prior to being in bobsleigh, Schmidheiny also competed in athletics as a decathlete. He competed in the United States for the University of Arizona and still holds the decathlon records at Sun Devil Stadium in the discus and javelin throws .

References
1994 bobsleigh four-man results
 Decathlon 2000 information on Switzerland results featuring Schmidheiny
 Sun Devil Stadium track records prior to the 2007 outdoor track & field season
 University of Arizona athletes who have competed in the Olympics (up to the 2004 Summer Olympics in Athens)

1967 births
Bobsledders at the 1994 Winter Olympics
Olympic bobsledders of Switzerland
Living people
Swiss decathletes
Swiss male bobsledders
Arizona Wildcats men's track and field athletes
Sportspeople from Basel-Stadt
20th-century Swiss people